Kinmen Airport , commonly known as the Shangyi Airport, is a civilian airport serving Kinmen, Fujian Province, Republic of China. It is located at Jinhu Township of Kinmen County. It was authorized to become a C-class airport under the direct supervision of the Civil Aeronautics Administration, Ministry of Transportation and Communications of the Executive Yuan. It serves an average of 1.2 million passengers every year.

With the direct Cross-Strait flights between mainland China and Taiwan being expensive compared to domestic fares for each side respectively, this makes travel via Kinmen with an hourly short thirty-minute ferry ride to Xiamen's Wutong Ferry Terminal, close to Xiamen Gaoqi International Airport, very popular. Check-in facilities for Kinmen Airport flights exists within the Wutong Ferry Terminal to assist in travel from the mainland to Taiwan.

History
Kinmen Airport was originally established in 1949 in Sihung Village. In June 1951, the Ministry of National Defense ratified TransAsia Airways to launch its first flight to Kinmen and a once-a-week scheduled flight began to operate. On 23 August 1958, the flight was cancelled due to Second Taiwan Strait Crisis with the People's Liberation Army (PLA). The airport was then moved to Shang-i where it is now located, taken over by the Republic of China Air Force (ROCAF) in consideration of the war with PLA.

With the growing number of passengers traveling between Taiwan Island and Kinmen, the government started to reestablish the civilian flight between the two and it began operation in September 1987 by Far Eastern Air Transport, sharing the same apron and terminal building with ROCAF at the airport. Since then, the new era of civilian flight to Kinmen began. Many other airlines joined the flight route.

Taking the necessary steps to accommodate the passenger growth to Kinmen, the Civil Aeronautics Administration (CAA) coordinated with the government for general construction plan of NT$1.5 billion and built a new civilian airport at the northeastern side of the military airport. On 1 March 1994, the Kinmen Civil Airport was formally established, aiming at providing much more safety, convenience and comfort for the passengers and promoting the progress and prosperity of Kinmen. On 3 March 2000, the CAA implemented improvements of facilities, flight security and quality of service at the airport.

Facilities
The approach route to Kinmen Airport used to be the most dangerous in Taiwan due to the proximity to Mainland China and constrains in terrain, the Runway 06 equipped the SSALR approach lighting system (ALS) while the Runway 24 has MALSF. The Runway 06 established the instrument landing system (ILS) in September 2003 after the negotiation with CAAC Xiamen ACC.

A 2,580-metre connecting road links to a highway leading to two townships.

Airlines and destinations

See also

 Civil Aeronautics Administration (Taiwan)
 Transportation in Taiwan
 List of airports in Taiwan

References

External links

 Official Website in Traditional Chinese
 Official website in English
 
 

1994 establishments in Taiwan
Airports established in 1994
Airports in Taiwan
Buildings and structures in Kinmen County
Jinhu Township
Transportation in Kinmen County